Victoria Bridge is a road bridge running north–south between Datchet and Windsor, Berkshire, England. It crosses the River Thames on the reach between Old Windsor Lock and Romney Lock. It was rebuilt in 1967 to replace a damaged bridge.

The Victoria and Albert Bridges in Datchet were built to replace the old Datchet Bridge as part of the re-routing of the Datchet to Windsor roads following the expansion of the grounds of Windsor Castle. Prince Albert is said to have had a part in the design Victoria Bridge was built in 1851, paid for partly by the Windsor, Staines and Richmond Railway Company who were keen to have access to Windsor across part of the castle property.  The original bridge was built of cast iron with stone abutments.  The bridge was severely damaged by a group of tanks crossing it during World War II but was not closed until 1963, operating with weight restrictions.  There was a temporary Bailey bridge until 1966, then the central crossing was replaced by a concrete structure and reopened in 1967. Under the terms of the original contract, British Rail were required to contribute to the cost.
The Thames Path crosses the bridge rejoining the original towpath on the Windsor side for the northern part of Home Park, the towpath access in Home Park, Windsor having been lost due to the Windsor Castle Act 1848.

See also
Crossings of the River Thames

References

Bridges across the River Thames
Bridges in Berkshire
Bridges completed in 1967
Datchet
Road bridges in England
Windsor, Berkshire